Leprince is a French surname. 'le prince' means 'the prince'. Notable people with the surname include:

René Leprince (1876–1929), French silent film director
Xavier Leprince (1799–1826), French painter, drawer, and engraver

See also
Leprince-Ringuet
Jeanne-Marie Leprince de Beaumont

French-language surnames